Colegio De La Salle is a Lasallian educational institution located in Bayamón, Puerto Rico. It is the only De La Salle institution open on the island. The other was located in Añasco but it is now closed. Established at the Riverview suburb in Bayamón, Puerto Rico on the 15th of August 1962, the institution has been in service for over 50 years. Initially, the institution merely offered middle-through-high school education, but has since expanded to a K-12 curriculum. Guided by faith, the Gospel and the belief in man as image of God, the main purpose of our existence is the student. Linked by the faith, the fraternity and committed with the service believe in an education releasing for the best conducting personal and community of the student. Also, we consider the teacher as the most important means for the achievement of this mission.

References

External links
 Colegio De La Salle Site
 

Educational institutions established in 1962
High schools in Puerto Rico
Buildings and structures in Bayamón, Puerto Rico